In mathematics Antoine's necklace is a topological embedding of the Cantor set in 3-dimensional Euclidean space, whose complement is not simply connected. It also serves as a counterexample to the claim that all Cantor spaces are ambiently homeomorphic to each other.

Construction

Antoine's necklace is constructed iteratively like so: Begin with a solid torus A0 (iteration 0). Next, construct a "necklace" of smaller, linked tori that lie inside A0. This necklace is A1 (iteration 1). Each torus composing A1 can be replaced with another smaller necklace as was done for A0. Doing this yields A2 (iteration 2).

This process can be repeated a countably infinite number of times to create an An for all n. Antoine's necklace A is defined as the intersection of all the iterations.

Properties

Since the solid tori are chosen to become arbitrarily small as the iteration number increases, the connected components of A must be single points.  It is then easy to verify that A is closed, dense-in-itself, and totally disconnected, having the cardinality of the continuum. This is sufficient to conclude that as an abstract metric space A is homeomorphic to the Cantor set.

However, as a subset of Euclidean space A is not ambiently homeomorphic to the standard Cantor set C, embedded in R3 on a line segment. That is, there is no bi-continuous map from R3 → R3 that carries C onto A. To show this, suppose there was such a map h : R3 → R3, and consider a loop k that is interlocked with the necklace. k cannot be continuously shrunk to a point without touching A because two loops cannot be continuously unlinked. Now consider any loop j disjoint from C. j can be shrunk to a point without touching C because we can simply move it through the gap intervals. However, the loop g = h−1(k) is a loop that cannot be shrunk to a point without touching C, which contradicts the previous statement. Therefore, h cannot exist.

In fact, there is no homeomorphism of R3 sending A to a set of Hausdorff dimension < 1, since the complement of such a set must be simply-connected.

See also 

 
 
 
 
  
 Wild knot
 Hawaiian earring

References

Further reading

Topology